Lada is a village and municipality in Prešov District in the Prešov Region of eastern Slovakia.

History
In historical records the village was first mentioned in 1410.

Geography

Population 
It has a population of about 842 people (2020-12-31).

References

External links
 
 

Villages and municipalities in Prešov District
Šariš